Kenneth Lamont "Kent" Bazemore Jr. (born July 1, 1989) is an American professional basketball player who last played for the Los Angeles Lakers of the National Basketball Association (NBA). As a junior at Old Dominion University in 2010–11, Bazemore won the Lefty Driesell Award, an award given to the best defensive player in college basketball.

College career
Bazemore, a 6'5" shooting guard from Kelford, North Carolina, redshirted the 2007–08 season. As a freshman in 2008–09, Bazemore was a key rotation player for the Monarchs, averaging 4.5 points and 3.1 rebounds per game as ODU won the 2009 CollegeInsider.com Tournament. As a sophomore, he moved into the starting lineup and was a driving force for the Colonial Athletic Association regular-season and tournament champions. Bazemore averaged 8.4 points, 3.4 assists, 4.2 rebounds and 1.9 steals per game. He was named to the CAA All-Defensive team that season.

As a junior, Old Dominion repeated as tournament champions and made the 2011 NCAA tournament, losing to eventual national runner-up Butler 60–58. Bazemore averaged career highs of 12.3 points, 5.1 rebounds and 2.2 steals per game and was named the CAA Defensive player of the year and second team All-Conference.  He also gained national recognition, receiving the Lefty Driesell Award given to the nation's top defensive player.

Prior to the 2011–12 season Bazemore was named the CAA preseason player of the year.  He was also named a preseason Mid-Major All-American by collegeinsider.com. In his final season at ODU, Bazemore averaged 15.4 points, 6.1 rebounds and 3.1 assists per game.

At halftime of a game against state rival VCU on December 10, 2016, Old Dominion retired Bazemore's #24 Monarchs jersey and inducted him into the school's athletic Ring of Honor.

Bazemore earned two college degrees from Old Dominion, in Human Services and Criminal Justice.

Professional career

Golden State Warriors (2012–2014)
After going undrafted in the 2012 NBA draft, Bazemore joined the Oklahoma City Thunder for the Orlando Summer League and the Golden State Warriors for the Las Vegas Summer League. On July 26, he signed with Golden State. During his rookie season, he was assigned multiple times to the Santa Cruz Warriors of the NBA Development League. On March 15, 2013, he scored a season-high 14 points in a loss to the Chicago Bulls.

In July 2013, Bazemore re-joined Golden State for the 2013 NBA Summer League, where he was named a Summer League All-Tournament Team Recipient. The Warriors won the Summer League championship. On February 1, 2014, he was reassigned to the Santa Cruz Warriors. He was recalled by Golden State on February 2, reassigned on February 11, and recalled again February 12.

Los Angeles Lakers (2014)
On February 19, 2014, Bazemore was traded, along with MarShon Brooks, to the Los Angeles Lakers in exchange for Steve Blake. On March 4, he tied his then career high of 23 points in a loss to the New Orleans Pelicans. On April 7, he was ruled out of the rest of the season after suffering a torn tendon in his right foot.

Atlanta Hawks (2014–2019)

On September 23, 2014, Bazemore signed with the Atlanta Hawks. On March 28, 2015, he scored a season-high 20 points in a 115–100 loss to the Charlotte Hornets.

On November 7, 2015, Bazemore scored a career-high 25 points in a 114–99 win over the Washington Wizards. On December 14, 2015, he set a new career high with 28 points in a 100–88 loss to the Miami Heat.

On July 7, 2016, Bazemore re-signed with the Hawks. On November 8, 2016, he scored a season-high 25 points against the Cleveland Cavaliers. On January 23, 2017, he scored 25 points for a second time against the Los Angeles Clippers.

On March 2, 2018, Bazemore scored a then career-high 29 points in a 114–109 loss to the Golden State Warriors.

On October 24, 2018, Bazemore scored a career-high 32 points in a 111–104 win over the Dallas Mavericks. On December 26, 2018, he tied a career high with 32 points in a 129–121 loss to the Indiana Pacers.

On April 12, 2019, Bazemore exercised his $19.2 million player option for the 2019–20 season.

Portland Trail Blazers (2019–2020)
On June 24, 2019, Bazemore was traded to the Portland Trail Blazers in exchange for Evan Turner. He made his debut for the team on October 23, logging four points and five steals in a 100–108 loss to the Denver Nuggets.

Sacramento Kings (2020)
On January 20, 2020, Bazemore was traded, alongside Anthony Tolliver and two future second-round picks, to the Sacramento Kings in exchange for Trevor Ariza, Wenyen Gabriel and Caleb Swanigan. Bazemore made his debut for the team two days later, scoring seven points in a 106–127 loss to the Detroit Pistons.

Return to Golden State (2020–2021)
On December 1, 2020, Bazemore signed a one-year contract with the Golden State Warriors to join the team for a second stint. He made his debut for the team on December 22, logging two points, two rebounds and two assists in a 99–125 loss to the Brooklyn Nets. On February 17, 2021, Bazemore scored a season-high 26 points, alongside eight rebounds, three assists and three steals, in a 120–112 overtime win over the Miami Heat.

Return to the Lakers (2021–2022)
On August 6, 2021, Bazemore signed with the Los Angeles Lakers. On January 28, 2022, he scored a season-high 13 points in a 114–117 loss to the Charlotte Hornets.

On September 21, 2022, Bazemore signed with the Sacramento Kings. He was waived on October 13.

Career statistics

NBA

Regular season

|-
| style="text-align:left;"| 
| style="text-align:left;"| Golden State
| 61 || 0 || 4.4 || .371 || .294 || .614 || .4 || .4 || .3 || .1 || 2.0
|-
| style="text-align:left;"| 
| style="text-align:left;"| Golden State
| 44 || 0 || 6.1 || .371 || .256 || .528 || .9 || .5 || .3 || .1 || 2.3
|-
| style="text-align:left;"| 
| style="text-align:left;"| L.A. Lakers
| 23 || 15 || 28.0 || .451 || .371 || .644 || 3.3 || 3.1 || 1.3 || .3 || 13.1
|-
| style="text-align:left;"| 
| style="text-align:left;"| Atlanta
| 75 || 10 || 17.7 || .426 || .364 || .600 || 3.0 || 1.0 || .7 || .4 || 5.2
|-
| style="text-align:left;"| 
| style="text-align:left;"| Atlanta
| 75 || 68 || 27.8 || .441 || .357 || .815 || 5.1 || 2.3 || 1.3 || .5 || 11.6
|-
| style="text-align:left;"| 
| style="text-align:left;"| Atlanta
| 73 || 64 || 26.9 || .409 || .346 || .708 || 3.2 || 2.4 || 1.3 || .7 || 11.0
|-
| style="text-align:left;"| 
| style="text-align:left;"| Atlanta
| 65 || 65 || 27.5 || .420 || .394 || .796 || 3.8 || 3.5 || 1.5 || .7 || 12.9
|-
| style="text-align:left;"| 
| style="text-align:left;"| Atlanta
| 67 || 35 || 24.5 || .402 || .320 || .726 || 3.9 || 2.3 || 1.3 || .6 || 11.6
|-
| style="text-align:left;"| 
| style="text-align:left;"| Portland
| 43 || 21 || 25.8 || .347 || .327 || .806 || 4.0 || 2.3 || 1.4 || .7 || 7.9
|-
| style="text-align:left;"| 
| style="text-align:left;"| Sacramento
| 25 || 0 || 23.1 || .418 || .384 || .733 || 4.9 || 1.3 || 1.2 || .4 || 10.3
|-
| style="text-align:left;"| 
| style="text-align:left;"| Golden State
| 67 || 18 || 19.9 || .449 || .408 || .692 || 3.4 || 1.6 || 1.0 || .5 || 7.2
|-
| style="text-align:left;"| 
| style="text-align:left;"| L.A. Lakers
| 39 || 14 || 14.0 || .324 || .363 || .765 || 1.8 || .9 || .6 || .2 || 3.4
|- class="sortbottom"
| style="text-align:center;" colspan="2"| Career
| 657 || 310 || 20.6 || .413 || .356 || .724 || 3.2 || 1.8 || 1.0 || .5 || 8.2

Playoffs

|-
| style="text-align:left;"| 2013
| style="text-align:left;"| Golden State
| 9 || 0 || 1.8 || .125 || .000 || .000 || .6 || .2 || .1 || .0 || .2
|-
| style="text-align:left;"| 2015
| style="text-align:left;"| Atlanta
| 16 || 2 || 18.9 || .423 || .214 || .677 || 3.3 || .8 || .7 || .6 || 5.4
|-
| style="text-align:left;"| 2016
| style="text-align:left;"| Atlanta
| 10 || 10 || 32.5 || .364 || .262 || .682 || 6.6 || 1.9 || 1.4 || .6 || 11.9
|-
| style="text-align:left;"| 2017
| style="text-align:left;"| Atlanta
| 6 || 0 || 25.0 || .396 || .292 || .714 || 3.8 || 3.3 || .7 || .8 || 9.8
|- class="sortbottom"
| style="text-align:center;" colspan="2"| Career
| 41 || 12 || 19.4 || .379 || .254 || .648 || 3.6 || 1.3 || .8 || .5 || 6.5

College

|-
| style="text-align:left;"| 2008–09
| style="text-align:left;"| Old Dominion
| 35 || 9 || 16.3 || .433 || .265 || .429 || 3.1 || 1.5 || .9 || .2 || 4.5
|-
| style="text-align:left;"| 2009–10
| style="text-align:left;"| Old Dominion
| 36 || 29 || 26.7 || .486 || .300 || .486 || 4.2 || 3.4 || 1.9 || .5 || 8.4
|-
| style="text-align:left;"| 2010–11
| style="text-align:left;"| Old Dominion
| 34 || 33 || 30.7 || .481 || .408 || .662 || 5.1 || 2.9 || 2.2 || .9 || 12.3
|-
| style="text-align:left;"| 2011–12
| style="text-align:left;"| Old Dominion
| 35 || 32 || 31.5 || .407 || .321 || .632 || 6.1 || 3.1 || 2.1 || .3 || 15.4
|- class="sortbottom"
| style="text-align:center;" colspan="2"| Career
| 140 || 103 || 26.3 || .447 || .334 || .581 || 4.6 || 2.7 || 1.8 || .5 || 10.1

Personal life
Bazemore is a member of the Pi Kappa Alpha fraternity. While with the Warriors, Bazemore was noted for his celebrations while on the team's bench, which became a fixture on YouTube and were included in the NBA 2K14 video game. Kent married Samantha Serpe in Asheville, North Carolina in 2017

Role in Stephen Curry endorsement contract 
In March 2016, ESPN writer Ethan Sherwood Strauss published a story about how Under Armour successfully signed away Stephen Curry from Nike in the 2013 offseason, and revealed that Bazemore played a significant role in the signing.

During the 2012 offseason, when Bazemore was an undrafted rookie trying to make the Warriors roster, his agent contacted Under Armour and convinced the company to take a chance on Bazemore as an endorser, noting that rising Warriors stars Curry and Klay Thompson had endorsement deals set to expire in the near future. Under Armour signed Bazemore to a deal, mainly providing massive amounts of branded merchandise—enough to allow Bazemore to provide clothing to several Warriors staff members. Once Bazemore made the team, he and his fellow North Carolinian Curry bonded over their common origins and shared work ethic. Bazemore then sold Curry on signing with Under Armour, which he did following several missteps by Nike. According to Strauss, "UA owes him [Bazemore] now. Big time." As a result, Bazemore has a six-figure deal with the company, an unusually high amount for a player of his stature in the league. The company also recognized Bazemore's role in luring Curry by signing an apparel deal with Old Dominion for seven times the amount that the school had previously received from Nike. His deal with Under Armour enabled him to provide most of the funding for ODU's new basketball practice facility.

References

External links

 Official website
 Old Dominion Monarchs bio

1989 births
Living people
20th-century African-American people
21st-century African-American sportspeople
African-American basketball players
American men's basketball players
Atlanta Hawks players
Basketball players from North Carolina
Golden State Warriors players
Los Angeles Lakers players
Old Dominion Monarchs men's basketball players
People from Bertie County, North Carolina
Portland Trail Blazers players
Sacramento Kings players
Santa Cruz Warriors players
Shooting guards
Undrafted National Basketball Association players